Clear Creek Township is located in the far northwest corner of Jasper County, Iowa. It contains the Clear Creek Wildlife Area.

History
Clear Creek Township was established in 1849.

Geography
Land area: 35.7 sq. mi.
Water area: 0.0 sq. mi.

Demographics
For 2000 census
Population: 356 (all rural)
Males: 175 (49.2%)
Females: 181 (50.8%)

Occupied houses/apartments: 356 (288 owner occupied, 68 renter occupied)
% of renters: 19%
State: 28%

Races in Clear Creek township:
White non-Hispanic: 99.4%
Asian: 0.3%
Two or more races: 0.3%

Median age of males: 43.1
Median age of females: 42.9

Population density: 10 people per square mile.

70% of Clear Creek township residents lived in the same house 5 years ago.
Out of people who lived in different houses, 50% lived in this county.
Out of people who lived in different counties, 77% lived in Iowa.

References

External links

http://iagenweb.org/jasper/maps/township/Clear_Creek.htm

Townships in Jasper County, Iowa
Townships in Iowa
1849 establishments in Iowa
Populated places established in 1849